Morville is a village and civil parish about 3 miles west of Bridgnorth, in the Shropshire district, in the county of Shropshire, England. In 2011, the parish had a population of 392. The parish touches Acton Round, Astley Abbotts, Aston Eyre, Barrow, Bridgnorth, Chetton, Tasley and Upton Cressett.

Landmarks 
There are 20 listed buildings in Morville. Morville has a church called St Gregory the Great.

History 
The generic part of the name "Morville" means 'open land'. Morville was recorded in the Domesday Book as Membrefelde.

See also 
 Morville Priory

References

External links 
 Parish council

Villages in Shropshire
Civil parishes in Shropshire